Acidia is a small genus of flies in the family Tephritidae. It formerly contained many species, but by some authors has since been restricted to two.

List of species 
 Acidia cognata (Wiedemann, 1817)
 Acidia japonica Shiraki, 1933

References 

Trypetinae
Tephritidae genera
Taxa named by Jean-Baptiste Robineau-Desvoidy